Buyan Suldus (died 1362) was chief of one segment of the Suldus clan of Taichuud tribe during the 1350s and 1360s, and was chief amir of the Chagatai ulus for a short time after 1358.

Although did not control the entire Suldus tribe, Buyan was its most powerful chief. He was the leader of the Suldus in Shadman and Chaghaniyan. 

When the Qara'unas Amir Qazaghan killed Qazan Khan and took effective control of the Chagatai Khanate in 1346, his base of power was in the southern portion of the ulus; he mostly left the northern tribes alone. Despite the fact that the Suldus were considered a northern tribe, Buyan did cooperate with Qazaghan on occasion. During Qazaghan's punitive expedition against the Kartids in 1351, for example, he was the only leader of a northern tribe to participate. His attitude changed, however, when Qazaghan was killed in 1358 and was succeeded by his son, ‘Abdullah. ‘Abdullah wanted greater control over the northern tribes and, for this reason, moved his capital to Samarkand. Buyan resented having a strong Qara'unas presence near his territories and revolted. Together with Hajji Beg, the leader of the Barlas tribe, they overthrew ‘Abdullah and killed his puppet khan. Buyan then became amir of the ulus.

In contrast to ‘Abdullah, Buyan made almost no attempt to assert any power over the other tribes of the ulus. He preferred spending his time drinking, and as a result the ulus fell into a state of disorder. Taking advantage of this, the Chagatai Khan of Moghulistan, Tughluq Temur, invaded Transoxiana in early 1360. None of the tribal leaders resisted, but after occupying the region for a short time the Moghuls left. 

In the meantime, ‘Abdullah's nephew Amir Husayn returned from exile and, eager to avenge his family, formed a coalition with the Yasa'uri under Amir Khidr and the Barlas, now under Amir Timur, against Buyan Suldus. Timur had taken control of the Barlas by deceiving Hajji Beg, and, knowing that Buyan was an ally of Hajji Beg, had much to gain by moving against him. The allies headed towards Shadman against Buyan, but he fled to Badakhshan, whose ruler, Baha' ad-Din, similarly fled when they invaded his territory. Amir Husayn then claimed leadership of the ulus.

In 1361 Tughluq Temur again invaded the region, and Buyan submitted to them at Samarkand. This time, however, the Moghul Khan wanted to centralize his rule, and began a purge of tribal leaders whom he considered to be potential enemies. Buyan Suldus was executed by the Moghuls in 1362. Leadership of his portion of the Suldus devolved upon his son, Shaykh Muhammad.

1362 deaths
Year of birth unknown